Solea Pfeiffer is a Zimbabwe-born American actress and singer.  She is best known for her role as Eliza Hamilton in the first national tour of Hamilton, which she landed after performing as Maria in West Side Story at the Hollywood Bowl. Two years later, she starred in the New York City Center's production of Evita. She has been in a relationship with Kevin Csolak since 2020.

Education and career 
Pfeiffer was born in Zimbabwe and grew up in Seattle, Washington. Her mother was African-American, and was adopted and raised in Boston, while her father is white. Her maternal grandfather was former congressman Ron Dellums; she and her mother were able to connect with him a year before he died. Her parents are anthropologists at the University of Washington. Pfeiffer graduated from University of Michigan with a BFA and attended the Royal Academy of Dramatic Art.

Pfeiffer began her interest in music by taking violin lessons at four years old. She attended theater camps and performed in her middle and high school productions.

At 21 years old, Pfeiffer was selected by Gustavo Dudamel to perform as Maria in West Side Story at the Hollywood Bowl after the Los Angeles Philharmonic's artistic team showed him YouTube videos of her performing.

A year later, she made her national tour debut as Eliza Hamilton in the Angelica Company of Hamilton, earning positive reviews.

In 2019, Pfeiffer shared the role of Eva Perón with Maia Reficco in the New York City Center's production of Evita, Pfeiffer playing Perón from age 20–33. Pfeiffer earned positive reviews for her performance.

Performance credits

References 

21st-century American actresses
American stage actresses
Living people
Actresses from Seattle
University of Michigan alumni
American musical theatre actresses
1994 births
Alumni of RADA
African-American actresses